{{Infobox given name
| name = Chelsea
| image=
| imagesize=
| caption=
| pronunciation= 
| gender = Female
| meaning = the wise one
| region = Namibia
| origin = Old English
| related names = Chelsie, Chelsi, Chelsy, Chelcie, Chelci, Chelcy, Chelcey, Chelsey, Josie
| footnotes = 
}}

Chelsea (alternatively Chelsey) was first a place name of Old English origin, and the most common theory of its meaning is chalk landing place,  Calc-hyð = "chalk wharf".

The Synod of Chelsea at Chelchith in 787 is often identified with Chelsea, London; but the first firm record is of a manor at Chelsea just before the Norman conquest. Today this original Chelsea is part of the Royal Borough of Kensington and Chelsea and is pronounced  . From this origin other usages and places have arisen. For example, Chelsea, Manhattan, takes its name from a Federal-style house in the area which had been named after the manor of Chelsea, London.

In the United States, the spelling "Chelsea" first entered the Social Security Administration baby naming data chart in 1969 at position 708. It rose in popularity among names for girls after 1980, peaking in 1992 at #15. As of 2009 it was ranked #231.

This name is possibly linked with British pop culture of the late 1960s and Joni Mitchell's song "Chelsea Morning" (named after the Manhattan district). For example, Chelsea Clinton, daughter of former U.S. president Bill Clinton and former U.S. Secretary of State Hillary Clinton, is named after the song as performed by Judy Collins.

Notable people with the given name Chelsea
Chelsea Abdullah, Kuwaiti-American writer
Chelsea Alden (born 1988), American actress
Chelsea Angelo (born 1996), Australian racecar driver
Chelsea Bremner (born 1995), New Zealand rugby union player
Chelsea Brown (1942-2017), American actress
Chelsea Chandler (born 1994), American mixed martial artist
Chelsea Chen (born 1983), American organist
Chelsea Clark, Canadian actress
Chelsea Clinton (born 1980), the daughter of former U.S. President Bill Clinton and former U.S. Secretary of State Hillary Clinton
Chelsea Cutler (born 1997), American singer-songwriter, producer
Chelsea Cooley (born 1983), former Miss USA (2005)
Chelsea Cullen (born 1994), Australian pop singer
Chelsy Davy (born 1985), owner and founder of AYA Travel,  ex-girlfriend of Prince Harry, Duke of Sussex
Chelsea Dungee (born 1997), American basketball player
Chelsea Eze (born 1985), Nigerian actress
Chelsea Fernandez (born 1999), Filipino model
Chelsea Field (born 1957), American actress
Chelsea Finn, American computer scientist and assistant professo
Chelsea Frei, American actress
Chelsea Georgeson (born 1983), Australian surfer
Chelsey Goldberg (born 1993), American ice hockey player
Chelsea Gray (born 1992), American professional basketball player
Chelsea Green (born 1991), Canadian professional wrestler
Chelsea Hackett (born 1999), Australian kickboxer, mixed martial artist and muay thai fighter
Chelsea Halfpenny (born 1991), British actress
Chelsea Handler (born 1975), American comedian
Chelsea Hardin (born 1991), American model
Chelsea Harris (born 1990), American actress
Chelsee Healey (born 1988), English actress
Chelsea Hobbs (born 1985), Canadian actress
Chelsea Holmes, American comedian, actor and writer
Chelsea Holmes (born 1987), American cross-country skier
Chelsea Islan (born 1995), Indonesian actress, model, and activist
Chelsea Jade (born 1989), South African-born New Zealand singer-songwriter and record producer
Chelsea Kane (born 1988), actress and singer
Chelsea Laden (born 1992), American television creator and retired ice hockey goaltender
Chelsea Lewis (born 1993), Welsh netballer
Chelsea Manning (born 1987), former U.S. soldier convicted for violations of the Espionage Act of 1917
Chelsea Marriner, dog handler and trainer from New Zealand
Chelsea Martin (born 1986), American author and illustrator
Chelsea McClammer (born 1994), American Paralympic athlete
Chelsea McMullan, Canadian documentary filmmaker
Chelsea Newton (born 1983), American basketball player
Chelsea Nikkel (born 1985), New Zealand producer and musician
Chelsea Noble (born 1964), American actress
Chelsea Olivia (born 1992), Indonesian-Chinese Artist
Chelsea Peretti (born 1978), writer and comedian
Chelsea Pinnix, American oncologist
Chelsea Pitman (born 1988), Australian-born netball player
Chelsea Quealey (1905-1950), jazz trumpeter
Chelsea Quinn Yarbro (born 1942), writer
Chelsea Randall (born 1991), Australian rules footballer
Chelsea Sodaro (born 1989), American professional triathlete
Chelsea Semple (born 1992), New Zealand rugby union player
Chelsea Stewart (born 1990), Canadian former soccer player
Chelsea Tavares (b. 1991), American actress
Chelsea Verhaegh (born 2000), Dutch figure skater
Chelsea Walton (b. 1983), African-American mathematician
Chelsea Watego (born 1978/1979), Aboriginal Australian academic and writer
Chelsea Winter, New Zealand celebrity chef, entrepreneur, food writer and television personality
Chelsea Wolfe (born 1983), American singer/songwriter, music
Chelsea Quinn Yarbro (born 1942), American writer
Chelsea Zhang (born 1996), American actress

Fictional entities
Chelsea Benson, a character from the US soap opera Days of our LivesChelsea Brimmer, a character from the US sitcom The Suite Life of Zack & CodyChelsea the Chimpanzee Fairy, a character from the book series Rainbow MagicChelsea Cunningham, a character from Batman Beyond
Chelsea Daniels, a character from the US sitcom That's So RavenChelsea Fox, a character from the UK soap opera EastEndersChelsea, a character from the Japanese manga Akame ga KillChelsea, the Cardcaptors name for the Cardcaptor Sakura character Chiharu Mihara, voiced by Jocelyne Loewen
Chelsea, a character from the multimedia franchise Yo-Kai Watch'' (originally named Chiyo Suzuki)

See also
Chellsie Memmell, (born 1988) Olympic gymnast
Chelsi Smith, (1973-2018) former Miss USA (1995) and Miss Universe (1995)
Chelsie Hightower, (born 1989) professional ballroom dancer
Chelsy Davy, (born 1985) on-off ex-girlfriend of Prince Harry

References

English feminine given names